Chamorro ((CNMI),  (Guam)) is an Austronesian language spoken by about 58,000 people, numbering about 25,800 on Guam and about 32,200 in the Northern Mariana Islands and elsewhere. It is the native and spoken language of the Chamorro people, the indigenous people of the Mariana Islands. There are three different dialects of Chamorro — Guamanian, Rotanese, and the dialect of the Northern Mariana Islands (NMI) excluding Rota.

Classification
Unlike most of its neighbors, Chamorro is not classified as a Micronesian or Polynesian language. Rather, like Palauan, it possibly constitutes an independent branch of the Malayo-Polynesian language family.

At the time the Spanish rule over Guam ended, it was thought that Chamorro was a semi-creole language, with a substantial amount of the vocabulary of Spanish origin and beginning to have a high level of mutual intelligibility with Spanish. It is reported that even in the early 1920s, Spanish was reported to be a living language in Guam for commercial transactions, but the use of Spanish and Chamorro was rapidly declining as a result of English pressure.

Spanish influences in Chamorro exist due to three centuries of Spanish colonial rule. Many words in the Chamorro lexicon are of Latin etymological origin via Spanish, but the pronunciation of these loanwords has been nativized to the phonology of Chamorro, and their use conforms to indigenous grammatical structures. Some authors consider Chamorro a mixed language under a historical point of view, even though it remains independent and unique. In his Chamorro Reference Grammar, Donald M. Topping states:

"The most notable influence on Chamorro language and culture came from the Spanish.... There was wholesale borrowing of Spanish words and phrases into Chamorro, and there was even some borrowing from the Spanish sound system. But this borrowing was linguistically superficial. The bones of the Chamorro language remained intact.... In virtually all cases of borrowing, Spanish words were forced to conform to the Chamorro sound system.... While Spanish may have left a lasting mark on Chamorro vocabulary, as it did on many Philippine and South American languages, it had virtually no effect on Chamorro grammar.... The Japanese influence on Chamorro was much greater than that of German but much less than Spanish. Once again, the linguistic influence was restricted exclusively to vocabulary items, many of which refer to manufactured objects....

Rodríguez-Ponga (1995) considers Chamorro to be a Spanish-Austronesian or a Spanish-Austronesian mixed language or at least a language that has emerged from a process of contact and creolization on the island of Guam since modern Chamorro is influenced in vocabulary and has in its grammar many elements of Spanish origin: verbs, articles, prepositions, numerals, conjunctions, etc.

The process, which began in the 17th century and ended in the early 20th century, meant a profound change from the old Chamorro (paleo-Chamorro) to modern Chamorro (neo-Chamorro) in its grammar, phonology, and vocabulary.

Speakers

The Chamorro language is threatened, with a precipitous drop in language fluency over the past century. It is estimated that 75% of the population of Guam was literate in the Chamorro language around the time the United States captured the island during the Spanish–American War (there are no similar language fluency estimates for other areas of the Mariana Islands during this time). A century later, the 2000 U.S. Census showed that fewer than 20% of Chamorros living in Guam speak their heritage language fluently, and the vast majority of those were over the age of 55.

A number of forces have contributed to the steep, post-World War II decline of Chamorro language fluency. There is a long history of colonization in the Marianas, beginning with the Spanish colonization in 1668 and, eventually, the American acquisition of Guam in 1898 (whose hegemony continues to this day). This imposed power structures privileging the language of the region's colonizers. According to estimates, a large majority, as stated above (75%), maintained active knowledge of the Chamorro language even during the Spanish colonial era, but this was all to change with the advent of American imperialism and enforcement of the English language.

In Guam, the language suffered additional suppression when the U.S. government banned the Chamorro language in schools and workplaces in 1922. They collected and burned all Chamorro dictionaries. Similar policies were undertaken by the Japanese government when they controlled the region during World War II. After World War II, when Guam was recaptured by the United States, the American administrators of the island continued to impose "no Chamorro" language restrictions in local schools, teaching only English and disciplining students for speaking their indigenous tongue.

Even though these oppressive language policies were progressively lifted, Chamorro usage had substantially decreased. Subsequent generations were often raised in households where only the oldest family members were fluent. Lack of exposure made it increasingly difficult to pick up Chamorro as a second language. Within a few generations, English replaced Chamorro as the language of daily life.

There is a difference in the rate of Chamorro language fluency between Guam and the rest of the Marianas. On Guam (called  by Chamorro speakers, from the word , meaning 'have'; its English gloss 'We have' references the island's providing everything needed to live) the number of native Chamorro speakers has dwindled in the last decade or so. In the Northern Mariana Islands (NMI), young Chamorros speak the language fluently but prefer to use English when speaking to their children. Chamorro is common among Chamorro households in the Northern Marianas, but fluency has greatly decreased among Guamanian Chamorros during the years of American rule in favor of American English, which is commonplace throughout the inhabited Marianas.

Today, NMI Chamorros and Guamanian Chamorros disagree strongly on each other's linguistic fluency. An NMI Chamorro would say that Guamanian Chamorros speak the language incorrectly or speak "broken Chamorro", whereas a Guamanian Chamorro might consider the form used by NMI Chamorros to be archaic.

Revitalization efforts 
Representatives from Guam have unsuccessfully lobbied the United States to take action to promote and protect the language.

In 2013, "Guam will be instituting Public Law 31-45, which increases the teaching of the Chamorro language and culture in Guam schools," extending instruction to include grades 7–10.

Other efforts have been made in recent times, most notably Chamorro immersion schools. One example is the Huråo Guåhan Academy, at the Chamorro Village in Hagåtña, GU. This program is led by Ann Marie Arceo and her husband, Ray Arceo. According to Huråo's official YouTube page, "Huråo Academy is one if not the first Chamoru Immersion Schools that focus on the teaching of Chamoru language and Self-identity on Guam. Huråo was founded as a non-profit in June 2005." The academy has been praised by many for the continuity of the Chamoru language.

Other creative ways to incorporate and promote the Chamorro language have been found in the use of applications for smartphones, internet videos and television. From Chamorro dictionaries, to the most recent "Speak Chamorro" app, efforts are growing and expanding in ways to preserve and protect the Chamorro language and identity.

On YouTube, a popular Chamorro soap opera Siha has received mostly positive feedback from native Chamorro speakers on its ability to weave dramatics, the Chamorro language, and island culture into an entertaining program. On TV, Nihi! Kids is a first-of-its-kind show, because it is targeted "for Guam’s nenis that aims to perpetuate Chamoru language and culture while encouraging environmental stewardship, healthy choices and character development."

Phonology
Chamorro has 24 phonemes: 18 are consonants and 6 are vowels.

Vowels
Chamorro has at least 6 vowels, which include: 
 , open back unrounded vowel equivalent to the "a" in father. 
 , near-open front unrounded vowel equivalent to the "a" in cat. 
 , close-mid front unrounded vowel equivalent to the "e" in the Received Pronunciation of met. 
 , close front unrounded vowel equivalent to the "ee" in sleep. 
 , close-mid back unrounded vowel equivalent to the "o" in corn.
 , close back rounded vowel equivalent to the "u" in flu.

Consonants
Below is a chart of Chamorro consonants; all are unaspirated.

  does not occur initially.
 Affricates // can be realized as palatal [] before non-low front vowels.

Grammar 
Chamorro is a VSO or verb–subject–object language. However, the word order can be very flexible and change to SVO (subject-verb-object), like English, if necessary to convey different types of relative clauses depending on context and to stress parts of what someone is trying to say or convey. Again, that is subject to debate as those on Guam believe the Chamorro word order is flexible, but those in the CNMI do not.

Chamorro is also an agglutinative language, whose grammar allows root words to be modified by a number of affixes. For example,  'talked a while (with/to)', passive marking prefix , root verb , referential suffix  'to' (forced morphophonemically to change to e) with excrescent consonant n, and suffix  'a short amount of time'.  Thus  'He/she was told (something) for a while'.

Chamorro has many Spanish loanwords and other words have Spanish etymological roots (such as  'shop/store' from Spanish ), which may lead some to mistakenly conclude that the language is a Spanish creole, but Chamorro very much uses its loanwords in a Micronesian way ( 'playing ball' from  'ball, play ball' with verbalizing infix  and reduplication of the first syllable of root).

Chamorro is a predicate-initial head-marking language. It has a rich agreement system in the nominal and in the verbal domains.

Chamorro is also known for its wh-agreement in the verb. The agreement morphemes agree with features (roughly the grammatical case feature) of the question phrase and replace the regular subject–verb agreement in transitive realis clauses:

Pronouns 
This set of pronouns is found in Chamorro:

Orthography

Additionally, some letter combinations in Chamorro sometimes represent single phonemes.

The letter  is usually (though not always) pronounced more like dz (an approximation of the regional Spanish pronunciation of y as ); it is also sometimes used to represent the same sound as the letter i by Guamanian speakers. Thus the Guamanian place name spelled Yona is pronounced "Dzonia"/, not  as might be expected.  is usually pronounced like ts rather than like English ch. Chamorro  is usually a tap , but is rolled  between vowels, and it is a retroflex approximant , like English r, at the beginning of words. Words that begin with r in the Chamorro lexicon are exclusively loanwords.

Chamorro has geminate consonants which are written double (GG, DD, KK, MM, NGNG, PP, SS, TT), native diphthongs AI and AO, plus OI, OE, IA, IU, IE in loanwords; penultimate stress, except where marked otherwise, if marked at all in writing, usually with an acute accent, as in  'blue' or  'big'.

Today, there is an ongoing issue on the Chamorro language orthography between NMI Chamorros and Guamanian Chamorros (example: NMI Chamorro vs. Guamanian CHamoru).  As of 2021, the Guamanian Chamorros have come out with an official orthography for the Guamanian dialect, whereas the NMI Chamorros have yet to develop an official orthography.  Rather, the NMI Chamorros spell their words based on how it sounds.

Vocabulary

Numbers 
Old Chamorro used different number words based on categories: basic numbers (for date, time, etc.), living things, inanimate things, and long objects.

These are similar to the corresponding Spanish terms  (10),  (20),  (30),  (40),  (50),  (60),  (70),  (80),  (90).

Days of the week
Current common Chamorro uses only the days of the week which are Spanish in origin but are spelled differently.  There is currently an effort by Chamorro language advocates to introduce or re-introduce native terms for the Chamorro days of the week.
Unfortunately, both major dialects differ in the terminology used.  Guamanian advocates support a number-based system derived from Old Chamorro numerals, whereas the NMI advocates support a more unique system.

Months
Before the Spanish-based 12-month calendar became predominant, the Chamoru 13-month lunar calendar was commonly used. The first month in the left column below corresponds with January. In the right column are the Spanish-based months.

Basic phrases

Studies
Chamorro is studied at the University of Guam and in several academic institutions of Guam and the Northern Marianas.

Researchers in several countries are studying aspects of Chamorro. In 2009, the Chamorro Linguistics International Network (CHIN) was established in Bremen, Germany. CHiN was founded on the occasion of the Chamorro Day (27 September 2009) which was part of the programme of the Festival of Languages. The foundation ceremony was attended by people from Germany, Guam, the Netherlands, New Zealand, Spain, Switzerland, and the United States of America.

See also

Footnotes

References

Notes

References

Further reading
 Aguon, K. B. (1995). Chamorro: A Complete Course of Study. Agana, Guam: K.B. Aguon.

External links

Chamorro-English Online Dictionary
https://web.archive.org/web/20131223170220/http://ns.gov.gu/language.html
https://web.archive.org/web/20060613193013/http://www.offisland.com/thelanguage.html
https://web.archive.org/web/20031119062318/http://www.chamorro.com/fino/fino.html
Chamorro-English dictionary, partially available at Google Books.
Chamorro Reference Grammar, partially available at Google Books.
https://web.archive.org/web/20050405213852/http://www.websters-online-dictionary.org/definition/Chamorro-english/
Chamorro Wordlist at the Austronesian Basic Vocabulary Database
https://web.archive.org/web/20081210161635/http://www.sous-le-soleil-de-guam.com/
https://web.archive.org/web/20110716095102/http://www.fb10.uni-bremen.de/chin/ Chamorro Linguistics International Network (CHIN).
Text and software files from "Chamorro-English Dictionary (PALI Language Texts: Micronesia)" by Donald M. Topping, Pedro M. Ogo, and Bernadita C. Dungca, published in 1975 by University of Hawaii Press archived at Kaipuleohone.
Index cards of plant and animal names in Chamorro language in Kaipuleohone.

 
Language
Agglutinative languages
Endangered Austronesian languages
Endangered languages of Oceania
Languages of Guam
Languages of the Mariana Islands
Languages of the Northern Mariana Islands
Malayo-Polynesian languages
Verb–subject–object languages
Vulnerable languages